Chrysochroa elegans, the Japanese jewel beetle (tamamushi in Japanese), is a species of metallic wood-boring beetles (Buprestidae). It may be a synonym for Chrysochroa fulgidissima.

References

External links 
 Chrysochroa elegans at insectoid.info

Beetles described in 1784
Buprestidae